Goran Mihajlović (born 6 May 1971) is a Serbian former professional tennis player.

A native of Belgrade, Mihajlović competed on the professional tour during the 1990s, reaching a best singles ranking of 398. He featured mostly in satellite tournaments and played in the qualifying draw for the 1993 US Open. In 1995 he made a Davis Cup appearance for Yugoslavia against San Marino, winning his singles rubber over Gabriel Francini.

Mihajlović moved to Germany in the 1990s and works there as a tennis coach.

See also
List of Yugoslavia Davis Cup team representatives

References

External links
 
 
 

1971 births
Living people
Yugoslav male tennis players
Serbian male tennis players
Tennis players from Belgrade
Serbian emigrants to Germany